Bumpy Ride is an album released by London indie pop band The Hoosiers. It is a rereleased version of their 2010 album The Illusion of Safety. It was released in the UK on 11 April 2011. The album features 3 new tracks not present on The Illusion of Safety, as well as a cover of Soft Cell's "Say Hello, Wave Goodbye", which was an iTunes-exclusive bonus track from said album. The deluxe version includes a DVD of live versions of some of the tracks.

Track listing

References

2011 albums
The Hoosiers albums